Osummit is a suburb of Johannesburg, South Africa. It is located in Region B of the City of Johannesburg Metropolitan Municipality.

History
The suburb is situated on part of an old Witwatersrand farm called Driefontein. It was established on 5 June 1957.

References

Johannesburg Region B